In algebraic geometry, Barsotti–Tate groups or p-divisible groups are similar to the points of order a power of p on an abelian variety in characteristic p.

Definition

 defined a p-divisible group  of height h (over a scheme S) to be an inductive system of groups Gn for n≥0, such that Gn is a finite group scheme over S of order phn and such that Gn is (identified with) the group of elements of order divisible by pn in Gn+1.

More generally,  defined a  Barsotti–Tate group G over a scheme S to be an fppf sheaf of commutative groups over S that is p-divisible, p-torsion, 
such that the points G(1) of order p of G are (represented by) a finite locally free scheme.
The group G(1) has rank ph for some locally constant function h on S, called the rank or height of the group G. The subgroup G(n) of points of order pn is a scheme of rank pnh, and G is the direct limit of these subgroups.

Example

Take Gn to be the cyclic group of order pn (or rather the group scheme corresponding to it). This is a p-divisible group of height 1. 
Take Gn to be the group scheme of pnth roots of 1. This is a p-divisible group of height 1. 
Take Gn  to be the subgroup scheme of elements of order pn of an abelian variety. This is a p-divisible group of height 2d where d is the dimension of the Abelian variety.

References

Algebraic groups